Zimmorlei Farquharson (born 27 April 2002) is an Australian rules footballer who plays for Brisbane in the AFL Women's (AFLW).

Farquharson was born and raised in Dalby, Queensland to a mother from Papua New Guinea and an Australian father. She attended Concordia Lutheran College throughout her upbringing.

After spending the 2021 season on the Lions' list without making her debut, she played her first AFLW game in round 3 of the 2022 season in the Lions' win against  at Carrara Stadium. For her debut, she received a nomination for the 2022 AFL Women's Rising Star.

References

External links

2002 births
Living people
Australian people of Papua New Guinean descent
Sportswomen from Queensland
Australian rules footballers from Queensland
Brisbane Lions (AFLW) players
21st-century Australian women